Philip Gridelet (born 30 April 1967) is an English former footballer, who played 192 games in the Football League for Barnsley, Rotherham United and Southend United from 1990 to 1999.

Career

Playing career
He played for Hendon and Barnet, before moving to Barnsley in 1990 for a fee of £175,000. He made six appearances in the League for Barnsley before moving to Rotherham United in March 1993. Gridelet signed for Southend United in September 1993, where he stayed for six-years making 177 appearances, scoring nine goals in the Football League. He then moved to Woking in December 1998, after a short spell with Stevenage Borough. Gridelet later joined Bishop's Stortford, before moving to Harrow Borough in October 2001.

Coaching career
Gridelet later moved into coaching with Harrow Borough, before leaving in March 2006. In June 2006, he was appointed as assistant-manager of Conference South club, Hayes.

References

External links

Living people
1971 births
Footballers from Hendon
English footballers
Hendon F.C. players
Barnet F.C. players
Barnsley F.C. players
Rotherham United F.C. players
Southend United F.C. players
Woking F.C. players
Bishop's Stortford F.C. players
Harrow Borough F.C. players
English Football League players
National League (English football) players
Stevenage F.C. players
Association football midfielders